is a city in Wakayama Prefecture, Japan. , the city had an estimated population of 26,755 in 11737 households and a population density of 110 persons per km².

Geography
Arida is located in north-central Wakayama prefecture and facing the Kii Channel. It occupies an alluvial plain formed along the Aridagawa River which runs through the center of the city. The northern and southern portions of the city are lined with the steep Nagamine Mountains.

Neighboring municipalities
Wakayama Prefecture
Kainan
Aridagawa
Yuasa

Climate
Arida has a Humid subtropical climate (Köppen Cfa) characterized by warm summers and cool winters with light to no snowfall.  The average annual temperature in Arida is 15.7 °C. The average annual rainfall is 1878 mm with September as the wettest month. The temperatures are highest on average in August, at around 26.0 °C, and lowest in January, at around 5.8 °C. The area is subject to typhoons in summer.

Demographics
Per Japanese census data, the population of Arida has decreased steadily over the past 40 years.

History
The area of the modern city of Arida was within ancient Kii Province, and the Buddhist temple of Jōmyō-ji in the city was founded in the early Heian period. The village of Miyazaki was founded with the creation of the modern municipalities system on April1, 1889. It was raised to town status on March 16,1901 and renamed Minoshima. On May 1, 1956 Minoshima merged with the neighboring villages of Yasuda, Miahara and Itoga to form the city of Arida.

Government
Arida has a mayor-council form of government with a directly elected mayor and a unicameral city council of 15 members. Arida contributes one member to the Wakayama Prefectural Assembly. In terms of national politics, the city is part of Wakayama 2nd district of the lower house of the Diet of Japan.

Economy
The largest industry in Arida is  large oil refinery operated by Eneos. Traditionally, the main economic activity was horticulture, with the city being one of the largest producers of  mikan or Japanese mandarins in Wakayama Prefecture.

Education
Arida has seven public elementary schools and four public middle schools operated by the city government and two public high schools operated by the Wakayama Prefectural Department of Education.

Transportation

Railway
 JR West – Kisei Main Line
 -  -

Highway

Local attractions 
Jōmyō-ji, Buddhist temple with National Important Cultural Property Main Hall and pagoda

Notable people from Arida 
Jun Toba, actor and musician
Miki Uemura, artistic gymnast

References

External links 

 
 Arida City official website 

Cities in Wakayama Prefecture
Populated coastal places in Japan
Arida, Wakayama